McPherson Stadium  is a sport stadium in McPherson, Kansas.  The facility is primarily used by the McPherson College Bulldogs football, soccer, and track and field teams.  The stadium is also used for McPherson USD 418 (the local high school) sporting events and other community events.

2003 Renovation
The stadium underwent extensive renovations in 2003 along with several other athletic and campus facilities.  The new stadium and facilities have been credited with playing a part of improving the football program at the college.

External links
 McPherson College Athletic Facilities Official website

References

College football venues
Sports venues in Kansas
Buildings and structures in McPherson County, Kansas
American football venues in Kansas